The Mali Air Force, established in 1961, serves as the primary aerial warfare branch of Mali's armed forces. The force was initially created with the assistance of the French military, which provided training and equipment to establish the air force's initial capabilities. In the following years, the Mali Air Force received significant support from the Soviet Union, which provided both equipment and training to the force.

History 
The Mali Air Force was founded in 1961 with French-supplied military aid. This included MH.1521 Broussard utility monoplane followed by two C-47 transports until replaced by Soviet aid starting in 1962 with four Antonov AN-2 Colt biplane transports and four Mi-4 light helicopters.

In the mid-1960s the Soviets delivered five MiG-17F fighters and a single MiG-15UTI fighter trainer to equip a squadron based at Bamako–Sénou initially with Soviet pilots. Two Ilyushin Il-14 transports and a Mil Mi-8 helicopter were delivered in 1971 followed by two Antonov An-24 transports.

In 1974, 12 MiG-21Bis were obtained from the Soviet Union, with a pair of two-seat MiG-21UMs to follow a couple of years later. These initial Fishbeds served alongside the four remaining MiG-17Fs and saw combat on two occasions during the Agacher Strip War in 1974 against Upper Volta, and again in 1985 with the same country, now renamed Burkina Faso. In 2005, another three MiG-21MFs were delivered from the Czech Republic, reinforcing the surviving jets. By 2010, the Fishbeds were only flown on ceremonial occasions. By January 2012, only one MiG-21MF and one MiG-21UM remained operational until they were grounded for lack of spare parts, ammunition, and pilots a few months later. In January 2013, the Nigerian Air Force sent a technical team to  Bamako–Sénou International, with the aim of refurbishing the MiG-21s, but the project was abandoned. Other jets withdrawn from service were six L-29 Delfins, which were used for training.

In June 2015 the Malian government ordered Super Tucano light attack aircraft from the Brazilian company Embraer. Four were paid for and were delivered in 2018. One of these crashed in Sévaré two years later, killing both pilots.

In December 2020, the Malian government ordered 4 Mi-171 helicopters. They were delivered by Russia on 30 September 2021.

Air Force

Current inventory

References 

Military of Mali
Mali